Arnold Alex Daoud (born May 19, 1943) is the former mayor of Miami Beach, Florida who served the City from 1985 to 1991. In 1991, Daoud was indicted for 41 counts of bribery. He was convicted and served seventeen months in a federal prison. After his release he wrote a book, Sins of South Beach.

Biography
Alex Daoud was born and grew up in the City of Miami Beach. His grandparents were Greek Orthodox and Greek Catholic immigrants from Lebanon. His mother, the youngest woman to pass the New York bar exam in the early 1920s, and his father, an antiques dealer, moved from New York to Florida during World War II. At the age of six, Daoud contracted polio; he was in a wheelchair for six months and later needed braces and crutches, but he eventually recovered without lifelong disability.

Daoud, an attorney, was an associate in the law firm of Galbut Galbut and Menin, although he reportedly did little legal work for them, focusing on public service. He served as a Miami City Attorney, then was elected to the Miami Beach City Commission in 1979. He was re-elected to a second term in 1981 and then a third term in 1983. In 1985, he became the first Roman Catholic to be elected Mayor of Miami Beach. In 1987, he won re-election by eighty-six percent of the popular vote. In 1989, he was re-elected to an unprecedented third term as Mayor of Miami Beach. However, on October 29, 1991, he was indicted on federal bribery charges. He admitted to receiving bribes from developers in return for political influence and city council votes, as well as soliciting free work on his house from contractors seeking city business. He was convicted of bribery in 1992 and of other corruption crimes in 1993. He served 17 months in federal prison, followed by 3 years of probation. He testified against many of the people who had paid him bribes.

In 2007, he published Sins of South Beach: The True Story of Corruption, Violence, and the Making of Miami Beach, which "chronicles the sex, violence and corruption of his time in public office." It is an autobiographical depiction of Miami Beach in the 1980s, a "retirement ghetto" plagued by rampant crime, and its regeneration into a premiere vacation and nightlife destination. He describes how crime was reduced by "attitude adjustment sessions," in which police would severely beat known criminals and then dump them in Miami across the causeway.

See also 
 List of mayors of Miami Beach, Florida

References

1943 births
Living people
American politicians convicted of federal public corruption crimes
American politicians of Lebanese descent
Mayors of Miami Beach, Florida
Politicians from Miami
Florida politicians convicted of crimes
Catholics from Florida